Harold Berens (born Isadore Harold Berenbaum; 4 March 1903 – 10 May 1995) was a British comedian and character actor.

Biography
He was born into a Jewish family in Glasgow, the son of a tailor, and grew up and was educated in Leeds, Harrogate, and Brussels.  After his father built up a successful business in Brighton, he moved there, and began performing at show business parties organised by his father.   After completing his education he worked as a shirt salesman, primarily to a show business clientele, while developing his own talent for comedy, especially his ability to imitate a wide range of different dialects, at private functions.  In the 1930s he opened his own shop in Regent Street, London, where he styled himself as "Shirtmaker to the Stars".  One of his customers was Carroll Levis, who thought that Berens was too professional a performer to perform in his regular amateur talent shows, and recommended that he audition for the BBC.

He won the support of BBC radio producer Ernest Longstaffe, who used him in radio programmes from the late 1930s and wrote some of his scripts.  Berens compered broadcasts by Maurice Winnick and his orchestra from the Dorchester Hotel, and then, in 1939, started compering shows by Jay Wilbur and his band for Radio Luxembourg.  During the Second World War, he made regular broadcasts for the services, and by 1941 was well known for his comedy routines, in which one of his characters was Mrs Twiddleswitch.  He became known as "The Man with a Thousand Voices."

He featured regularly in the radio series Hoop-La, with Robb Wilton and Max Wall, and became more popular after 1945 playing the role of a Cockney ignoramus on Ignorance Is Bliss, chaired by Stewart MacPherson, which was a BBC adaptation of the American show It Pays to Be Ignorant.  According to Roy Hudd, Berens' exclamations of "What a Geezer!" became a national catchphrase.   By 1947, it was said that he had done over 2,000 radio broadcasts.  He also appeared in four Royal Variety Performances.

He continued to feature on radio through the 1950s, notably as Mrs Mosseltoff on the show Ted Ray Time.  He also developed a career as a supporting actor in films and television.  His first film appearance was in Candlelight in Algeria (1944), followed by appearances in Third Time Lucky (1949), Up for the Cup (1950), Man from Tangier (1957), and The Pure Hell of St Trinian's (1960), among others.  He also appeared in such television shows as The Avengers and It's a Square World.  His final film appearances came in Trail of the Pink Panther (1982), Hear My Song (1991), and Carry On Columbus (1992).

Berens died in London in 1995, aged 92.

Filmography

References

External links
 

1903 births
1995 deaths
20th-century British comedians
Jewish British male actors